Nacionalismo was a far-right Argentine nationalist movement that around 1910 grew out of the "traditionalist" position, which was based on nostalgia for feudal economic relations and a more "organic" social order. It became a significant force in Argentine politics beginning in the 1930s. Nacionalismo was typically centred upon the support of order, hierarchy, corporatism, militant Catholicism, support of the landed estates, combined with the hatred of liberalism, leftism, Freemasonry, feminism, Jews and foreigners. It denounced liberalism and democracy as the prelude to communism. The movement also supported irredentism, declaring intentions to annex Uruguay, Paraguay, Chile and some southern and eastern parts of Bolivia.

Nacionalismo was strongly influenced by Maurrassism and Spanish clericalism as well as by Italian Fascism and Nazism. After the 1930 Argentine coup d'etat, Nacionalistas firmly supported the entrenchment of an authoritarian corporatist state led by a military leader. Nacionalistas often refused to participate in elections because of their opposition to elections as a derivative of liberalism. Its advocates were writers, journalists, a few politicians, colonels, and other junior military officers; the latter supported the Nationalists largely because, for most of their existence, they saw in the military the only potential political saviour of the country.

Ideology
Nacionalismo supported a "return to tradition, to the past, to sentiments authentically Argentine, ... [to] the reintegration of the nation with these essential values" these essential values included Roman Catholicism, claiming that to the Church "the Nation should be linked as the body to the soul". Nacionalismo opposed secular education, accusing it of being "Masonic laicism", and supported clerical control of education.

Nacionalismo based its twin policy of opposition to liberalism and socialism along with promotion of social justice on the papal encyclicals of 1891 (Rerum novarum) and 1931 (Quadragesimo anno). Nacionalismo supported improving relations between the social classes to achieve the Catholic ideal of an organic, "harmonious" society.

History
Beginning in the mid-1930s, Nacionalistas declared their concern for the working-class and support for social reform, with the newspaper La Voz Nacionalista declaring "The lack of equity, of welfare, of social justice, of humanity, has made the proletariat a beast of burden ... unable to enjoy life or the advances of civilization". By the late 1930s, with industrial development increasing in the country, Nacionalistas promoted a policy of progressive income redistribution to allow more money to be with wage-earners and thus allowing them to invest and widen the economy and increase industrial growth.

In the 1940s, the Nacionalistas rose from a fringe group to be a substantial political force in Argentina. In the 1940s, the Nacionalistas emphasized the need for economic sovereignty, requiring greater industrialization and the take-over of foreign companies. By the 1940s, the Nacionalistas was effectively run by the military clique known as the Grupo Oficiales de Unidos (GOU). The GOU was highly suspicious about the threat of communism and the Nacionalistas supported the revolution of 1943. 

Nacionalistas took control of President Pedro Pablo Ramírez's junta in October 1943, changing Argentina's foreign policy by refusing to permit any further discussion with the United States on the issue of breaking Argentina's relations with the Axis powers. The United States government responded by freezing the assets of Argentine banks in their country. In power, the Nacionalistas pursued a policy of social justice by supporting the appointment of Juan Perón (who later became the President of Argentina) as the head of the department of labour on 28 October 1943. Perón declared that the Nacionalista government was committed to a "revolution" that would keep national wealth in Argentina, give workers their dues, improve living standards without provoking class conflict, and attack both communism and international capitalism.

Facing pressure from the United States for Argentina to dissolve relations with the Axis powers, President Ramírez yielded on 26 January 1944. This was followed by Nacionalistas protesting this action and Ramírez banning all Nacionalista organizations in February. Nacionalista cabinet ministers resigned in protest, and the Nacionalistas subsequently overthrew Ramírez, retaining their hold on power of the government.

As an ideology, Nacionalismo was militarist, authoritarian, and sympathetic to the rule of a modern caudillo, who the Nationalists were frequently either hoping for or reinterpreting history to locate in the past.  Along these lines, a significant part of the intellectual work of Nacionalismo was the creation of historical revisionism as an academic movement in Argentina.  Nationalist historians published several works challenging the work of the liberal historians who had forged the dominant historical narrative of Argentina and presented 19th-century dictator Juan Manuel de Rosas as the kind of benevolent authoritarian leader that the country still needed.

While the nationalists themselves never really managed to maintain political power despite participating in a handful of successful coups throughout the 20th century (see, for example, José Félix Uriburu).  Their lasting legacy, however, is twofold: first, their enormous influence over the political discourse of contemporary Argentina, where right, left, and centre have all been heavily influenced by their discourse, in part through second-hand clerical and military influences and in part through Perón's adoption of some of their ideas and language.  

Second, the most recent military coup in Argentina was largely directed and conducted by Nationalists in the Argentine armed forces and most certainly dictated by their ideological legacy.  The Montoneros who were their targets were also heavily influenced by Nacionalismo, though their political convictions were very different from those of the military officers.

References
Hodges, Donald C.  Argentina, 1943-1976: The National Revolution and Resistance.  Albuquerque: University of New Mexico Press, 1976.
Rock, David.  Authoritarian Argentina: The Nationalist Movement, Its History and Its Impact.  Berkeley: University of California Press, 1993.
The Heritage of World Civilizations Volume 2: Since 1500'. Pearson Prentice Hall

Anti-Chilean sentiment
Anti-immigration politics in South America
Anti-Masonry
Antisemitism in Argentina
Argentine nationalism
Criticism of feminism
Fascism in Argentina
Nationalist parties in South America
Fascist movements